George Athans Sr. (4 January 1921 – 27 February 2007) was a Canadian diver. He was born in Kelowna, British Columbia, and was the father of Gary Athans. He competed at the 1936 Summer Olympics in Berlin, where he placed 25th in 10 metre platform. He competed at the 1948 Summer Olympics, where he placed 8th in men's platform and 9th in springboard.

References

External links
George Athans at Canadian Olympic Team

1921 births
2007 deaths
Sportspeople from Kelowna
Olympic divers of Canada
Divers at the 1936 Summer Olympics
Divers at the 1948 Summer Olympics
Canadian male divers
Divers at the 1938 British Empire Games
Divers at the 1950 British Empire Games
Commonwealth Games gold medallists for Canada
Commonwealth Games medallists in diving
Medallists at the 1950 British Empire Games